Aricia cramera, the southern brown argus, is a butterfly of the family Lycaenidae. It is a butterfly of Southern Europe and North Africa and can be found from Morocco and Tunisia up to Spain and Portugal, on Mediterranean islands including Menorca and on the Canary Islands.

The wingspan ranges to up to 30 mm. The butterfly flies from May to September depending on the location.

The larvae feed on Erodium, Helianthemum and Geranium species.

Description from Seitz

In specimens [ of astrarche ] from the Canaries the red  macular band of the upperside is occasionally quite uncommonly broad and of even width, so that it forms a regular band, only transected by the black veins; this is ab. cramera Eschsch. (= canariensis Black.) (80 a). I also caught very extreme specimens of this form on the slopes of the Aures Mts. in Algeria, although only singly; on the other hand I met on the Canaries with specimens of astrarche which certainly did not belong to cramera, but rather to calida.

See also
List of butterflies of Menorca

References

Aricia (butterfly)
Butterflies of Europe